Tim Page may refer to:

 Tim Page (photographer) (1944–2022), British-Australian photojournalist
 Tim Page (actor) (born 1947), New Zealand-born Australian actor
 Tim Page (music critic) (born 1954), American music critic, biographer, professor and memoirist